The 2010–11 Argentine Primera D Metropolitana was the season of fifth division professional of football in Argentina. A total of 18 teams competed; the champion was promoted to Primera C Metropolitana.

Club information

Table

Standings

Torneo Reducido

Relegation

See also
2010–11 in Argentine football

References

External links
List of Argentine second division champions by RSSSF

Primera D seasons
5